Rhyacionia washiyai is a species of moth of the family Tortricidae. It is found in Japan on the island of Hokkaido.

The wingspan is about 21 mm.

The larvae feed on Pinus nigra.

References

Moths described in 1940
Taxa named by Hiromichi Kono
Eucosmini